FAAH is an abbreviation, acronym, or initialism that may refer to:

 Fatty acid amide hydrolase, a protein found in cell membranes
 FightAIDS@Home, a distributed computing project
 Foil Arms and Hog, an Irish comedy troupe